The Dimasa Kingdom (also Kachari kingdom) was a late medieval/early modern kingdom in Assam, Northeast India ruled by Dimasa kings.  The Dimasa kingdom and others (Kamata, Chutiya) that developed in the wake of the Kamarupa kingdom were examples of new states that emerged from indigenous communities in medieval Assam as a result of socio-political transformations in these communities. The British finally annexed the kingdom: the plains in 1832 and the hills in 1834. This kingdom gave its name to undivided Cachar district of colonial Assam. And after independence the undivided Cachar district was split into three districts in Assam: Dima Hasao district (formerly North Cachar Hills), Cachar district, Hailakandi district.  The Ahom Buranjis called this kingdom Timisa.

In the 18th century, a divine Hindu origin was constructed for the rulers of the Kachari kingdom and it was named Hidimba, and the kings as Hidimbesvar. The name Hiḍimbā continued to be used in the official records when the East India Company took over the administration of Cachar.

Origins
The origin of the Dimasa Kingdom is not clear.  According to tradition the Dimasa had their domain in Kamarupa and their king belonged to a lineage called Ha-tsung-tsa or Ha-cheng-sa, a name first mentioned in a coin from 1520.  Some of them had to leave due to a political turmoil and while crossing the  Brahmaputra some of them were swept away—therefore, they are called Dimasa ("son of the big river"). The similarity in Dimasa traditions and religious beliefs with those of the Chutiya kingdom supports this tradition of initial unity and then divergence. Linguistic studies too point to a close association between the Dimasa language and the Moran language that was alive till the beginning of the 20th-century, suggesting that the Dimasa kingdom had an eastern Assam presence before the advent of the Ahoms. The Dimasas had a  tradition of worshipping Kechai Khaiti, the war goddess common among all Kachari peoples: as the Rabhas, Morans, Tiwas, Koch, Chutias, etc. According to an account in a Buranji, the first Ahom king Sukaphaa (r. 1228–1268) encountered a Kachari group in the Tirap region (currently in Arunachal Pradesh), who informed him that they along with their chief had to leave a place called Mohung (salt springs) losing it to the Nagas and that they were settled near the Dikhou river. This supports a tradition that the eastern boundary of the Kachari domain extended up to Mohong or Namchang (near Jeypore, Assam) beyond the river Dichang, before the arrival of Ahoms.

According to legend Hachengsa (or Hasengcha) was an extraordinary boy brought up by a tiger and a tigress in a forest near Dimapur who replaced the existing king following divine oracles; which likely indicates the emergence of a strong military leader able to consolidate power.   Subsequently, the Hasengcha Sengfang (clan) emerged and beginning with Khorapha (1520 in Dimapur), the Dimasa kings continued to draw lineage from Hachengcha in Maibong and Khaspur till the 19th century.

At Dimapur

It is assumed, by the 13th century, the Dimasa kingdom extended along the southern banks of Brahmaputra River, from Dikhow river to Kallang River and included the valley of Dhansiri and present-day Dima Hasao district.  According to the Buranjis of early 16th century  (that called the kings khun timisa), the Kachari settlements to the east of Dikhou withdrew before the Ahom advance. The Chutiya Kingdom existed in the Northeast and the Kamata Kingdom and the Baro-Bhuyans to its west.

In Dimapur, the remains of the Kachari city are still evident. The locals around Dimapur refer to the remains as the "Chess Pieces" of Dima Raja or the King of Dimasa. A few ancient temples only in upper Assam were then built of masonry, whereas the remains at Dimapur, for instance, which flourished centuries before the Ahoms arrived, show us that Kacharis knew all about the art of brick making and permanent buildings.

According to legend, at Dimapur, Dimasa Kachari elder prince Drikpati and the younger prince Daksina had a conflict and the younger prince along with his followers built the first capital in what is today Barak valley. Daksina and his followers later declared themselves as Dibrasa (Tiprasa) which means "Children of the Barak River". It led to the division of Dimasa kingdom into two - Dimasa and Tiprasa. 

This kingdom might have been part of ancient Sinitic networks such as the Ming dynasty (1368–1644).

Hostilities with Ahoms
The Ahoms had settled into the track between the Chutiya and the Dimasa Kingdoms that was inhabited by the Borahi and Moran people when they arrived in the Brahmaputra valley in the early 13th century. The first clash with the Ahom Kingdom took place in 1490, in which the Ahoms were defeated. The Ahoms pursued peace, and an Ahom princess was offered to the Kachari king and the  Kachari took control of the land beyond the Dhansiri. But the Ahoms were getting powerful and pushed the Kacharis back west. In 1526 the Kacharis defeated the Ahoms in a battle, but in the same year, they were defeated in a second battle. In 1531 the Ahoms advanced up to Dimapur, the capital. The king of the Kachari Kingdom along with his mother and many royals were killed after the Ahoms reached the city. The Ahoms later installed Detsung as the king of the Kachari Kingdom with yearly taxes of 20 Elephant and 1 lakhs of rupees (mudras). But in 1536 the Ahoms attacked the Kachari capital once again and sacked the city. The Dimasa abandoned Dimapur and retreated south to set up their new capital in Maibang. "Mai" means "Paddy" and "bang" means "Plenty or abundance".

At Maibang
At Maibang, the Dimasa Kachari kings came under Brahmin influence. The son of Detsung took a Hindu name, Nirbhay Narayan (Sankritised name), and established his Brahmin guru as the Dharmadhi that became an important institution of the state. The titular deity of the Dimasas changed from Kechai Khaiti to Ranachandi in the 16th-century as a result of Hinduisation.  The royal family (ruling clan) came under Hindu influence at Maibang and were bestowed with the kshatriya status, even though the first conversion of a Kachari king to Hinduism is recorded in Khaspur, much later. According to a legend constructed at the time, the royal family descends from Ghatotkacha, the son of Bhima of the Mahabharata fame, and Hidimbi, a princess of the Kachari people.

Chilarai attacked the kingdom on or after 1564, during the reign of either Durlabh Narayan or his predecessor, and made it into a tributary of the Koch Kingdom. The size of the annual tribute— seventy thousand rupees, one thousand gold mohurs and sixty elephants— testifies to the resourcefulness of the Kachari state.

A conflict with the Jaintia Kingdom over the region of Dimarua led to a battle and the defeat of the Jaintia king (Dhan Manik).  After the death of Dhan Manik, Satrudaman the Dimasa Kachari king, installed Jasa Manik on the throne who manipulated events to bring the Dimasa Kacharis into conflict with the Ahoms once again in 1618. Satrudaman, the most powerful Dimasa Kachari king, ruled over Dimarua in Nagaon district (long before it was ruled by Tiwa tribal chief (Jongal Balahu), North Cachar, Dhansiri valley, plains of Cachar and parts of eastern Sylhet. After his conquest of Sylhet, he struck coins in his name.

By the reign of Birdarpan Narayan (reign around 1644), the Kachari rule had withdrawn completely from the Dhansiri valley and it reverted to a jungle forming a barrier between the kingdom and the Ahom kingdom.  When a successor king, Tamradhwaj, declared independence, the Ahom king Rudra Singha deputed 2 of his generals to invade Maibong with over 71,000 soldiers, and destroyed its forts in 1706. Tamardhwaj fled to Jaintia Kingdom where he got treacherously imprisoned by the King of Jaintia Kingdom, after his imprisonment he sent messengers to the Assam king for help, in response Rudra Singha deputed his generals with over 43,000 troops to invade Jaintia kingdom. The Jaintia king was captured and taken to the court of Rudra Singha where the Jaintia king submitted and the territories of the Dimasa Kingdom and Jaintia kingdom got annexed to the Ahom kingdom.

State structure
Kacharis had three ruling clans (semfongs): Bodosa (an old historical clan), Thaosengsa (the clan to which the kings belonged), and Hasyungsa (to which the kings relatives belonged).

The king at Maibang was assisted in his state duties by a council of ministers (Patra and Bhandari), led by a chief called Barbhandari. These and other state offices were manned by people of the Dimasa group, who were not necessarily Hinduized. There were about 40 clans called Sengphong of the Dimasa people, each of which sent a representative to the royal assembly called Mel, a powerful institution that could elect a king. The representatives sat in the Mel mandap (Council Hall) according to the status of the Sengphong and which provided a counterfoil to royal powers.

Over time, the Sengphongs developed a hierarchical structure with five royal Sengphongs though most of the kings belonged to the Hacengha (Hasnusa) clan. Some of the clans provided specialized services to the state ministers, ambassadors, storekeepers, court writers, and other bureaucrats and ultimately developed into professional groups, e.g. Songyasa (king's cooks), Nablaisa (fishermen).

By the 17th century, the Dimasa Kachari rule extended into the plains of Cachar. The plains people did not participate in the courts of the Dimasa Kachari king directly. They were organized according to khels, and the king provided justice and collected revenue via an official called the Uzir.  Though the plains people did not participate in the Dimasa Kachari royal court, the Dharmadhi guru and other Brahmins in the court cast a considerable influence, especially with the beginning of the 18th century.

At Khaspur

In the medieval era, after the fall of Kamarupa kingdom the region of Khaspur was originally a part of the Tripura Kingdom, which was taken over by Koch king Chilarai in the 16th century. The region was ruled by a tributary ruler, Kamalnarayana, the brother of king Chilarai. Around 18th century Bhima Singha, the last Koch ruler of Khaspur, didn't have any male heir. His daughter, Kanchani, marries Laxmichandra, the Dimasa prince of Maibang kingdom. And once the last Koch king Bhima Singha died the Dimasas migrated to Khaspur, thus merging the two kingdoms into one as Kachari kingdom under the king Gopichandranarayan, as the control of the Khaspur kingdom went to the ruler of the Maibong kingdom as inheritance from the royal marriage and established their capital in Khaspur, near present-day Silchar. The independent rule of the Khaspur's Koch rulers ended in 1745 when it merged with the Kachari kingdom. Khaspur is a corrupted form of the word Kochpur. Gopichandranarayan (r.1745-1757), Harichandra (r.1757-1772) and Laxmichandra (r.1772-1773) were brothers and ruled the kingdom in succession. In 1790, a formal act of conversion took place and Gopichandranarayan and his brother Laxmichandranarayan were proclaimed to be Hindus of the Kshatriya caste.

The most powerful king of Dimasa Kacharis at Khaspur was Raja Shri Krishna Chandra Dwaja Narayan Hasnu Kachari. It is said that during his rule, the King of Manipur sought his help against the Burmese Army. The Kachari King Krishna Chandra defeated Burmese in the war and in lieu was offered the Manipuri Princess Induprabha. As he was already married to Rani Chandraprabha, he asked the princess to be married to his younger brother Govinda Chandra Hasnu.

Sanskritization
The fictitious but widely believed legend that was constructed by the Hindu Brahmins at Khaspur goes as follows: During their exile, the Pandavas came to the Kachari Kingdom where Bhima fell in love with Hidimbi (sister of Hidimba). Bhima married princess Hidimbi according to the Gandharva system and a son was born to princess Hidimbi, named Ghatotkacha. He ruled the Kachari Kingdom for many decades. Thereafter, kings of his lineage ruled over the vast land of the "Dilao" river ( which translates to "long river" in English), now known as Brahmaputra River for centuries until 4th century AD.

British occupation
The Dimasa Kachari kingdom came under Burmese occupation in the late early 19th-century along with the Ahom kingdom.  The last king, Govinda Chandra Hasnu, was restored by the British after the Yandabo Treaty in 1826, but he was unable to subjugate Senapati Tularam who ruled the hilly regions.  Senapati Tularam Thaosen domain was Mahur River and the Naga Hills in the south, the Doyang River on the west, the Dhansiri River on the east and Jamuna and Doyang  in the north.  In 1830, Govinda Chandra Hasnu died.  In 1832, Senapoti Tularam Thaosen was pensioned off and his region was annexed by the British to ultimately become the North Cachar district; and in 1833, Govinda Chandra's domain was also annexed to become the Cachar district.

After Raja Govinda Chandra
In The British annexed the Dimasa Kachari Kingdom under the doctrine of lapse. At the time of British annexation, the kingdom consisted of parts of Nagaon and Karbi Anglong; North Cachar (Dima Hasao), Cachar and the Jiri frontier of Manipur.

Rulers and Kings

Notes

References

 
 
 
 
 
 
 
 
 
 
 
 
 
 
 
 
 
 
 
 
 
 
 
 

Kingdoms of Assam